The Palace of Fuensalida, is a palace located in city of Toledo (Castile-La Mancha, Spain) built at the end of the first half of the 15th century by Pedro López de Ayala, the first lord of Fuensalida, is a great example of the Toledan Mudéjar, a historical typology that is scarce in Toledo built heritage, where merge three styles: Gothic, Plateresque and Mudéjar.

It is integrated in a big block, which also includes the Taller del Moro and the Iglesia de Santo Tomé, which forms the north façade of the Plaza del Conde.

The first Count of Fuensalida, Pedro López de Ayala, carved this house towards 1440 for the mayorazgos of this title, of which was founder. This first Count of Fuensalida, son of the famous Chancellor López de Ayala, was main mayor of Toledo, mayor of the fortresses of the city, and, consequently, retired mayor of the King.

Charles V, Holy Roman Emperor, despite his pilgrimage, landed in Toledo no less than nineteen homes, and he lived in this Palace while the construction of the Alcázar was completed. In his letters and in its courtyard, the child who would become king, Philip II, experienced some of his childhood experiences, along with his mother, the Empress. Today, a sculpture by Pompeo Leoni representing Isabel of Portugal presides over the courtyard of Fuensalida.

Legend
History, sometimes, is transmuted into legend. A particular episode happened in the Palace in the absence of the Emperor: the illness and death of his wife, Doña Isabel of Portugal. From here departed the procession with the corpse towards Granada and the legend arises that takes body and is maintained until today. Francisco de Borja, Duke of Gandía, an aulic knight, according to some, anonymously in love with the Empress, led the funeral procession, and he had to recognize Doña Isabel's corpse upon his arrival in the city of the Alhambra. There he opened the coffin and, after verifying the deterioration of the beauty of which it was his mistress, they say that he pronounced those proverbial words: I will not serve again to any lord that can die.

That event made him change his life. He was ordained a priest and professed in the Society of Jesus, of which he was third General Superior. Then the Church made him Saint.

References

External links

Palaces in Toledo, Spain
Mudéjar architecture in Castilla–La Mancha
Buildings and structures completed in 1440